Roscoe C. McCulloch (1880–1958) was a U.S. Senator from Ohio from 1929 to 1930. Senator McCulloch may also refer to:

George McCulloch (1792–1861), Pennsylvania State Senate
Henry Eustace McCulloch (1816–1895), Texas State Senate

See also
Senator McCullough (disambiguation)